Svoboda, or swoboda is the abstract noun that means freedom in various Slavic languages. It may also refer to:

Organizations

Media
 Radio Svoboda, operated by Radio Free Europe/Radio Liberty
 Svoboda (newspaper), a daily Ukrainian language newspaper published in New Jersey by Ukrainian National Association

Politics
 Svoboda (political party) (All-Ukrainian Union "Svoboda"), a nationalist political party in Ukraine
 Freedom Movement (Slovenia)

Sports
 NK Svoboda (disambiguation)

Places 
 Svoboda Factory Club, memorial building in Moscow
 Svoboda, Pazardzhik Province, a village in Bulgaria
 Svoboda nad Úpou, a town in the Czech Republic
 Svoboda, a former name of the Russian town of Liski, Voronezh Oblast

Surname 
 Svoboda (surname)

Other uses
 2559 Svoboda, asteroid
Svoboda, a lighting device designed by Josef Svoboda

See also 
 
 Swoboda (disambiguation) for the Polish spelling
 Sloboda (disambiguation) for the Slovak, Serbo-Croatian and Macedonian spelling